Papatzys ( Papatzýn; died 704) was, in the account of Theophanes the Confessor, the Khazar tudun of Kerch during the sojourn of Byzantine emperor Justinian II in Phanagoria. He was dispatched, along with Balgitzin, by Busir Khagan to kill Justinian in 704, after Busir was bribed by Tiberius III. Justinian's Khazar wife Theodora warned him in advance and Justinian escaped by sea, but not before murdering both Papatzys and Balgitzin.

References

7th-century births
704 deaths
Khazar people
Medieval Crimea